The Bafan are a Muslim community found in the state of Gujarat in India and a province of Sindh in Pakistan. They are one of a number of communities of Maldhari pastoral nomads found in the Banni region of Kutch.

History and origin

The Bafan claim to have originally from Sindh, and are a clan of the Thaheem tribe. They are said to have gotten the name bafan on account of their practice of eating boiled meat. The word bafan in the Kutchi means to boil. After leaving Sindh, the tribe's first settlement in Kutch was the village of Nagiari. The Bafan are now found mainly in Kutch, with smaller communities in Jamnagar and Sabarkantha.

Present circumstances

The Bafan speak a dialect of Kutchi, with substantial Sindhi loan words. They have four lineages, the Makani, Aliyani, Jassani, and Issacuola. Each of these live in a particular locality known as falia. Each of these clans are of equal status, and intermarry. Marriages are preferred with parallel cousins.

The majority of the Bafan are settled agriculturists, and few have access to irrigation facilities. They are essentially a community of marginal farmers. Historically, the Bafan were pastoral Maldhari nomads, raising buffaloes, cows and sheep, and grazed them in the Banni region. A few families are still nomads and are involved in selling milk to Bhuj. They often migrate to Saurashtra with to graze their cattle. Like many other Kutchis, the Bafan have migrated to others parts of India in search of work.

The Bafan have a caste council, known as the Nagiari Jamat. This jamat has representatives on the Muslim Education and Welfare Society, an organization based in Bhuj. The Society provides free boarding and lodging to the poor students, and also looks into the general welfare of the Muslim community. Like most Kutchi Muslims, they are Sunni Muslims, but incorporate many folk beliefs.

See also

Samma
Mutwa

References

Social groups of Gujarat
Tribes of Kutch
Maldhari communities
Samma tribes
Jat tribes
Sindhi tribes in India
Muslim communities of Gujarat